Wascana may refer to:

 Wascana Centre, a park in Regina, Saskatchewan
Wascana Creek, a creek in Regina, Saskatchewan
 Wascana Review, a biannual literary magazine 
 Wascana Trail, a series of interconnected hiking and mountain biking trails
 Regina—Wascana, a federal electoral district
Regina Wascana, a former provincial electoral district
Regina Wascana Plains, a provincial electoral district

See also
 Saskatchewan Oil & Gas Corporation, previously Wascana Energy